The 1966 Montreal municipal election took place on October 23, 1966, to elect a mayor and city councillors in Montreal, Quebec, Canada. Mayor Jean Drapeau was re-elected to another four-year term in office with little opposition.

Results (incomplete)
Mayor

Council

Post-election changes
The municipality of Saint-Michel was annexed into Montreal on October 25, 1968. Elections for Saint-Michel's four wards were held on December 1, 1968.

References

1966 Quebec municipal elections
Municipal elections in Montreal
1960s in Montreal
1966 in Quebec